Silvia Giordani (born 1973) is an Italian chemist who is Professor of Nanomaterials at Dublin City University. Her research considers carbon-based functional materials for biotechnology. She was awarded a L'Oréal-UNESCO For Women in Science fellowship in 2012.

Early life and education 
Giordani was born in Bergamo in Italy. She was an undergraduate student at the University of Milan, where she completed a Laura in pharmaceutical chemistry. Whilst studying Giordani worked as a chemical health analyst in the Public Health Laboratory of Bergamo. Whilst visiting her uncle in the United States for a study vacation she was awarded a doctoral scholarship, and eventually ended up a graduate student at the University of Miami. Her doctoral research considered digital processing at the molecular level. She moved to Trinity College Dublin for her first postdoctoral research position. Giordani moved to the University of Trieste for a scientific fellowship.

Research and career 
Giordani was awarded the President of Ireland Young Researcher Award to start her independent scientific career at Trinity College Dublin. She worked an assistant professor at TCD for six years, before launching her own research laboratory at the Istituto Italiano di Tecnologia. Her research group considered nano-carbon materials. She moved to the University of Turin as an associate professor in 2016. Soon after she was appointed a full Professor Chair of Nanomaterials within the School of Chemical Sciences at Dublin City University. Her research considers nanomaterials and the design of personalised drug delivery systems.

Awards and honours 

 2012 L'Oréal-UNESCO For Women in Science Awards Fellowship 
 2014 Royal Irish Academy Women in Science
 2018 University of Otago William Evans Fellowship
 2020 High Level Scientific Mobility Grant

Selected publications

References 

Italian chemists
People from Bergamo
1973 births
Living people

University of Milan alumni
University of Miami alumni
Academic staff of the University of Turin
Italian women chemists